Gerolamo Sersale (in Latin, Hieronymus Sirsalis) (Naples, 1584–Naples, 1 December 1654) was an Italian Jesuit astronomer and selenographer.  His surname is from a noble Neapolitan family that originated in Sorrento.  The town Sersale, a commune in the southern Italian province of Catanzaro, was founded in 1620.  A Jesuit priest, Sersale drew a fairly precise map of a full moon observed on 13 July 1650. The map was engraved in 1651 and was studied by other astronomers, like Grimaldi and praised and mentioned in Riccioli's Almagestum novum and Astronomia reformata. However, today it can be seen in the Naval Observatory of San Fernando in Cadiz, Spain.
With his telescope, the Jesuit Father Daniele Bartoli was able to see two spots on Mars in Naples in 1644.

The lunar crater Sirsalis is named after him.

See also
List of Jesuit scientists
List of Roman Catholic scientist-clerics

References

Sources 
 Geschichte der Mondkarten 
 Jesuit Lunar Craters

1584 births
1654 deaths
17th-century Italian astronomers
17th-century Italian Jesuits
Selenographers
Jesuit scientists